The 1956 NCAA Skiing Championships were contested in Winter Park, Colorado at the third annual NCAA-sanctioned ski tournament to determine the individual and team national champions of men's collegiate alpine skiing, cross-country skiing, and ski jumping in the United States.

Led by coach Willy Schaeffler, co-host Denver claimed their third national championship in as many years, with Dartmouth repeating as the runner-up in the team standings.

Repeat individual champions were Dartmouth's Chiharu Igaya (Alpine, Slalom), Denver's Willis Olson (Jumping, third consecutive), and Idaho's Eirik Berggren (Nordic). Less than two months earlier, Igaya was the silver medalist in slalom at the 1956 Winter Olympics in Cortina d'Ampezzo, Italy.

Venue

This year's championships were held March 23–25 in Colorado at Winter Park, west of Denver.

The third edition, these were the first NCAA championships in Colorado and the Rocky Mountains.

Team scoring

Individual events
Four events were held, which yielded seven individual titles.
Friday: Slalom
Saturday: Downhill, Cross Country
Sunday: Jumping

See also
List of NCAA skiing programs

References

1956 in sports in Colorado
NCAA Skiing Championships
1956 in American sports
1956 in alpine skiing
1956 in cross-country skiing
1956 in ski jumping
Skiing in Colorado